Óscar Omar Treviño Morales (born January 26, 1974) is a Mexican convicted drug lord and former leader of Los Zetas, a criminal organization. He was one of Mexico's most-wanted drug lords. His brother is Miguel Treviño Morales, a former leader of the group. The authorities believe he was the successor of his brother, who was arrested on July 15, 2013.

Criminal charges
Morales is allegedly responsible for several abductions and murders committed in Nuevo Laredo between 2005 and 2006 and the supply source for multi-kilogram loads of cocaine smuggled from Mexico to the United States. He was charged in a 2008 federal indictment in the U.S. District of Columbia, and the U.S. Department of State offered a reward of up to $5 million USD for information leading to his arrest and/or conviction. On 24 March 2010, the United States Department of the Treasury sanctioned him under the Foreign Narcotics Kingpin Designation Act (sometimes referred to simply as the "Kingpin Act"), for his involvement in drug trafficking along with fifty-three other international criminals and ten foreign entities. The act prohibited U.S. citizens and companies from doing any kind of business activity with him, and virtually froze all his assets in the U.S.

Arrest
At around 4:00 a.m. on March 4, 2015, Treviño Morales was captured inside a residence in Fuentes del Valle, an upper-class neighborhood in San Pedro Garza García, Nuevo León, by the Federal Police and the Mexican Army. Not a single shot was fired in the operation. In a nearby neighborhood, authorities arrested his financial operator Carlos Arturo Jiménez Encinas, along with four other people. Four days later he was transferred to the Federal Social Readaptation Center No.1, a maximum-security prison in Almoloya de Juárez, State of Mexico. He was formally charged in a federal court in Toluca, State of Mexico on March 13 for money laundering and for violating Mexico's Federal Law of Firearms and Explosives.

Aftermath
On 23 March 2015, Ramiro Pérez Moreno (alias "El Rana" or "The Frog"), a potential successor of "Z-42", was captured along with 4 other men. He was arrested in possession of 6 kilos of cocaine and marijuana, rifles and one hand grenade.

See also
 Infighting in Los Zetas
 List of Mexico's 37 most-wanted drug lords
 Mexican Drug War

References

Living people
Fugitives wanted by the United States
Fugitives wanted by Mexico
Fugitives wanted on organised crime charges
Los Zetas
1974 births
People sanctioned under the Foreign Narcotics Kingpin Designation Act
People from Nuevo Laredo